Miélan is a commune in the Gers department in southwestern France. The choral conductor Aurore Tillac was born in Miélan in 1980.

Geography

Population

See also
 Communes of the Gers department

References

Communes of Gers